Dario Čanađija (born 17 April 1994) is a Croatian football midfielder who plays for Aalesunds FK.

Honours
Rijeka
Croatian First Football League: 2016–17
Croatian Football Cup: 2016–17

Olimpija Ljubljana
Slovenian PrvaLiga: 2017–18
Slovenian Cup: 2017–18

External links

Dario Čanađija at Sportnet.hr 
Profile and statistics at NZS

References

1994 births
Living people
Sportspeople from Bjelovar
Croatian footballers
Association football midfielders
Croatia youth international footballers
Croatia under-21 international footballers
NK Slaven Belupo players
HNK Rijeka players
Spezia Calcio players
NK Olimpija Ljubljana (2005) players
HNK Gorica players
FC Astra Giurgiu players
Sarpsborg 08 FF players
Aalesunds FK players
Croatian Football League players
Serie B players
Slovenian PrvaLiga players
Liga I players
Eliteserien players
Croatian expatriate footballers
Croatian expatriate sportspeople in Italy
Croatian expatriate sportspeople in Slovenia
Croatian expatriate sportspeople in Romania
Croatian expatriate sportspeople in Norway
Expatriate footballers in Italy
Expatriate footballers in Slovenia
Expatriate footballers in Romania
Expatriate footballers in Norway